RS2 may refer to:

Audi RS2 Avant, high-performance estate car/station wagon, jointly developed by Audi and Porsche
ALCO RS-2, a diesel-electric locomotive built by Alco-GE
Rising Storm 2: Vietnam, a tactical first-person shooter video game set in the Vietnam War, sequel to Rising Storm
"RuneScape 2", an older version of the online video game RuneScape
Romancing SaGa 2, role-playing video game
Red Steel 2, a 2010 first-person action game
"Redstone 2", codename of the Windows 10 Creators Update, released April 2017
RS2, an album by Canadian bass guitarist and singer-songwriter Rhonda Smith
The second Randall–Sundrum model

See also

 
 RSRS
 RSS (disambiguation)
 RS (disambiguation)